Lumpaci the Vagabond is a 1936 German / Austrian film directed by Géza von Bolváry, adapted from the play by Johann Nestroy.

Plot summary

Differences from play

Cast

Soundtrack

See also 
Lumpaci the Vagabond (1922 film)

References

External links 

1936 films
1936 musical comedy films
1930s fantasy comedy films
Austrian musical comedy films
German musical comedy films
German fantasy comedy films
Films of Nazi Germany
1930s German-language films
Austrian black-and-white films
German black-and-white films
German films based on plays
Remakes of German films
Films set in the 19th century
1930s musical fantasy films
Films scored by Hans Lang
Films directed by Géza von Bolváry
1930s German films